Glenn Allen Jr. (born September 24, 1970) is the co-owner of Allen-Hock Motorsports, an American Speed Association (ASA) team. He is a former auto racer, participating in both the ASA and the NASCAR Busch Series during his career, and earning the 1996 NBS Rookie of the Year award.

Career

Busch Series
Allen participated in two Busch Series races from 1992 to 1995 before becoming a full-time driver in 1996.
Other than Mike Dillon, he was the only rookie to participate in all 26 events that year, and had two top-ten finishes. His 14th-place finish in the standings earned him the Rookie of the Year award. His best year came in 1998, when he had 7 top-tens and finished 11th in the points.

Afterwards, he joined Akins Motorsports to drive the No. 38 Ford Taurus in 1999. However, he struggled, finishing in the top twenty only five times in seventeen races, and was replaced by Hut Stricklin. Afterwards, Allen started in six races in the 2000 season, five of them for Felix Sabates. Failing to finish in the top twenty-five once, he was released.

ASA
After being released by Sabates, Allen went back to the ASA. Racing for Bud Gebben, he raced in ten events, finishing in the top-ten nine times. Nevertheless, he did not get a full-time ride, and appeared sparingly throughout the 2001 season. He served as a crew chief for Russ Tuttle in the 2002 season. Allen, who still was interested in racing, made a deal with Ed Hock in 2003 to drive in the ASA Series cars.

Later, Allen became the team manager for Kris Stump Motorsports. In 2006, he teamed up with Hock to create Allen-Hock Motorsports, which houses cars for Stump, Brent Downey and Tony Rosebrugh.

Motorsports career results

NASCAR
(key) (Bold – Pole position awarded by qualifying time. Italics – Pole position earned by points standings or practice time. * – Most laps led.)

Busch Series

Busch North Series

References

External links
 

Living people
1970 births
Sportspeople from Cincinnati
Racing drivers from Ohio
NASCAR drivers
American Speed Association drivers